Pound for Pound is the fifth studio album by Canadian heavy metal band Anvil, released in 1988.

Track listing

Personnel
Anvil
Steve "Lips" Kudlow – vocals, lead guitar
Dave Allison – rhythm guitar
Ian Dickson – bass
Robb Reiner – drums

Production
Paul Lachapelle – producer, engineer, mixing
Mel Berger – executive producer

References

1988 albums
Anvil (band) albums
Metal Blade Records albums
Enigma Records albums